Frederick Van Fleteren is an academic who was previously a Roman Catholic priest and Augustinian friar. 

Van Fleteren is a scholar of St. Augustine of Hippo and St. Anselm .   He is Professor of Philosophy at La Salle University and Distinguished Professor of Medieval Philosophy and Chair of St. Augustine at the Collegium Augustinianum Graduate School of Philosophy and Theology.

References

External links
At La Salle
Collegium Augustinianum

Living people
Collegium Augustinianum Graduate School of Philosophy and Theology
American Roman Catholic priests
La Salle University faculty
Year of birth missing (living people)